The William S. Moorhead Federal Building is a  tall skyscraper in downtown Pittsburgh, Pennsylvania, United States.  Plans for the building were announced on November 9, 1958, and the structure was completed in 1964. It has 23 floors and is the 21st tallest building in Pittsburgh.

History 
The building, then simply known as the Federal Building, was a $20 million project finished in 1964 as a centralized home for what had previously been a large number of scattered offices throughout several different office buildings in Pittsburgh. Designed by Altenhof & Bown, the building replaced an existing Greyhound bus station on the property. The building currently houses 21 tenants, including the Internal Revenue Service, the Veterans Administration, the Army Corps of Engineers (formerly housed in the Manor Building), the Weather Bureau (formerly in the US Post Office and Courthouse), the Federal Bureau of Investigation (formerly in the Union Trust Building), and the Central Intelligence Agency (originally referred to as "Agency 39"), employing 4,000 employees.

In 1980, the building, then home to 35 federal agencies, was renamed the William S. Moorhead Federal Building, in honor of retiring Representative William S. Moorhead. Despite some criticism of the practice of naming buildings after retiring officials at that time, the statute to rename the building was approved on October 9, 1980.

See also
List of tallest buildings in Pittsburgh

References

External links

Emporis
Skyscraperpage

Skyscraper office buildings in Pittsburgh
Government buildings completed in 1964